Untouchable was a South Korean hip hop duo managed by TS Entertainment. The group released their first single, "Ready To Shot", on 24 July 2006, but made their official debut on October 10, 2008, with the hit single "It's Okay".

History

2008–2010: Debut & success
Untouchable made their official debut on November 10, 2008 with their single "It's Okay" ft. Hwayobi. They released their first full album entitled "Quiet Storm" on January 8, 2009. Their single "Tell Me Why" ft. Hwa Young became a hit and topped online music charts. They followed this with the song "Oh", which was featured in their mini album "Untouchable", released June 9, 2009.

On February 4, 2010 their 2nd mini album "Untouchable: 2nd Mini Album" was released, featuring the vocals of Brown Eyed Girls' Narsha in the song "Living in the Heart." On February 9, Untouchable's "Living in the Heart" topped online music charts.

Untouchable's second album was postponed in 2010 due to the Yeonpyeong Island tragedy. The album "Who's Hot" was released in December with the title track "Make a fuss".

2011: "You you" release & military enlistment
Untouchable released their digital single "You you" on May 4, 2011.

Both members started their mandatory military service in August 2011.

2013: "Trips" and release from military
They returned from military service on May 1, 2013 and took a break before making their music comeback at the end of the year. They released Vain featuring Koonta of Rude Paper in November and followed up with a second track Trip which was released on their agency YouTube page on the December 5.

2014: "Take out" 
The duo returned in July with Take out featuring Mayson the Soul.

2015: "Cigarette & Liquor", "Mask On", "Crayon", collaborations & solo debut
On January 16, 2015, Untouchable released their 8th digital single album titled Cigarette & Liquor. On February 24, 2015 they made their comeback with a digital single called Mask On. On March 18, 2015 they released their 5th mini album titled HEIIVEN, the track Crayon served as the title track.

2019: Disbandment
On September 14, 2019, it was announced that Sleepy left TS Entertainment via lawsuit, and the duo disbanded.

Former Members
 Sleepy
 D.Action

Discography

Studio albums

Extended plays

Charted singles

References

External links
 

South Korean hip hop groups
Hip hop duos
Musical groups established in 2006
South Korean male rappers
TS Entertainment artists